David Bernstein may refer to:

David P. Bernstein (born 1956), professor of forensic psychotherapy
David Bernstein (law professor) (born 1967), American law professor
David I. Bernstein, dean of Pardes Institute of Jewish Studies, Jerusalem and New York City
David Bernstein (architect) (1937–2018), co-founder of Circle 33, see Levitt Bernstein
David Bernstein (executive) (born 1943), chairman of the British Red Cross, formerly chairman of French Connection, of Manchester City F.C., and of the English Football Association
David L. Bernstein, president and CEO of the Jewish Council for Public Affairs
David Bernstein (chess player), Israeli chess player (see Israeli Chess Championship)